Dalfsen is a railway station located in Dalfsen, Netherlands. The station was opened on 15 January 1903 and is located on the Zwolle–Emmen railway. Train services are operated by Arriva. The station is situated south of the river Vecht. Dalfsen is on the north bank of the river.

Previously, this station was called Dalfsen dorp (1903-1904), to differentiate it from another station called Dalfsen on the nearby Zwolle-Meppel railway line. On 1 November 1904, that station was renamed Berkum. Subsequently, this station was renamed Dalfsen.

Train services

Platforms

1 - Emmen
2 - Zwolle

Bus services

Accidents and incidents
On 23 February 2016, a passenger train collided with a crane on the line near Dalfsen. Two people died.

References

External links
NS website 
Dutch Public Transport journey planner 

Railway stations in Overijssel
Railway stations opened in 1903
Railway stations on the Emmerlijn
Dalfsen